Edwin Lewis Sutermeister  (1876-1958) was an American chemist who is best known for his work on papermaking.

Biography
Edwin Lewis Sutermeister was born in 1876 to Emmanuel Sutermeister and Harriet Georgianna Davenport. His sister was photographer Margaret Sutermeister.

Sutermeister's best known work is The Story of Paper Making, the result of experience during his twenty years' service as chemist in the industry.

Bibliography
The Story Of Papermaking. Kessinger Publishing, LLC, 2009 
Casein and its industrial applications. New York: Reinhold publishing corporation, 1939.
Chemistry of Pulp and Paper Making. New York: Wiley, 1920.

Notes

1876 births
1958 deaths
American chemists